The Soviet Navy's Project 611 (NATO reporting name: Zulu class) were one of the first Soviet post-war attack submarines. They were roughly as capable as the American GUPPY fleet-boat conversions. They were a contemporary of the Whiskey-class submarines and shared a similar sonar arrangement.  Like most conventional submarines designed 1946-1960, their design was influenced by the German Type XXI U-boat of the World War II era.

The first few boats of the class were equipped with twin 57mm and twin 25mm anti-aircraft guns and no snorkels, although the guns were removed and snorkels added soon after the boats entered service. Six were converted in 1956 to become the world's first ballistic missile submarines, one armed with a single R-11FM Scud missile and five others with two Scuds each.  They were designated as Project AV 611 and received the NATO reporting name of Zulu V. The missiles were too long to be contained in the boat's hull, and extended into the enlarged sail.  To be fired, the submarine had to surface and raise the missile out of the sail.  Soviet submarine B-67 successfully launched a missile on 16 September 1955.

The Zulus were the basis for the very successful Foxtrot-class submarine, which lent their hull to the Golf class of ballistic missile submarine.

Twenty-six boats were built overall, entering service from 1952 to 1957, 8 of them in Leningrad and 18 in Severodvinsk. Their names were initially B-61 through B-82 and B-88 through B-91, with most renamed in the 1970s or 1980s. The class received the NATO reporting names Zulu I through Zulu V, the last referring to the five converted missile-firing submarines (excluding the prototype).  It is unclear from references how many of each subclass were built. Most were repurposed for non-combat purposes before being destroyed.

References

Bibliography

External links 
 Zulu Class submarines - Complete Ship List (English)

 
Russian and Soviet navy submarine classes
Ballistic missile submarines